Sabar Uparey (English: Beyond All) is a 1955 Indian Bengali-language crime thriller film produced by M.P Production Private Ltd and directed by Agradoot, based on A.J. Cronin's 1953 novel, Beyond This Place. It stars Uttam Kumar and Suchitra Sen in leading roles. Chhabi Biswas, Pahari Sanyal and Nitish Mukherjee also play important roles in the movie. The music was composed by Robin Chatterjee. The movie was remade in Hindi as Kala Pani in 1958.

Plot
Prashanta Chatterjee (Chhabi Biswas) is sentenced to life imprisonment after the alleged murder of Hemangini, a lady based in Krishnanagar whom he is accused of loving and then dumping and murdering heinously.

Twelve years later, his only son Shankar (Uttam Kumar), who lives with his mother (Sobha Sen) in Patna, comes to Krishnanagar to prove his father's innocence and bring the actual perpetrators to justice. There he falls in love with Rita (Suchitra Sen), a girl who too had a life history of injustice. Together, they secretly conjure up various evidences against the actual criminal, a government lawyer(Nitish Mukherjee) who originally fought the case against his father 12 years back. In all this, they get the help of Rita's journalist brother (Pahari Sanyal) who, through his articles and friends in the Press, gathers public momentum to finally reopen the case.

Shankar presents the case himself and through various evidences and tact presentations, successfully pleads in favour of his father and proves the involvement of the actual criminal, the government lawyer, who killed Hemangini to benefit from a huge insurance in her name. Prashanta Choudhury is acquitted. Meanwhile, with 12 years of wretched life in the prisons and the thought that his wife and child had perished due to poverty, he seems to lose his mental balance. However, when brought in the midst of his family, sense and wellness returns to him. He thanks Rita's brother for his immense help and asks his sister's hand for his son Shankar.

Cast
Uttam Kumar as Shankar Chatterjee
Suchitra Sen as Rita
Chhabi Biswas as Prashanta Chatterjee, Shankar's father
Pahari Sanyal as Rita's brother, a journalist
Nitish Mukherjee as Government lawyer
Sobha Sen as Mahamaya, Shankar's mother
Jayashree Sen as Bina
Bithi Dasgupta
Bishweshwar Bhattacharya

Soundtrack

Reception & Remakes
The film became critically acclaimed and a huge blockbuster at the box office and it ran for 84 days in theatres. This is also the highest grossing Bengali film of 1955

Remake
The film was loosely remade in Hindi in 1958 as Kala Pani, produced and starring Dev Anand in his banner Navketan Films, with Madhubala playing the female lead.

References

External links
 
 Sabar Uparey at Upperstall.com

1955 films
Bengali-language Indian films
Indian crime thriller films
1950s crime thriller films
Films based on works by A. J. Cronin
1950s Bengali-language films
Bengali films remade in other languages
Films scored by Robin Chatterjee
Indian black-and-white films